Acrobrochus is a genus of brachiopods belonging to the family Terebratellidae.

The species of this genus are found in southernmost South Hemisphere.

Species:

Acrobrochus blochmanni 
Acrobrochus marotiriensis 
Acrobrochus vema

References

Brachiopod genera